Mavrc is a small settlement on the left bank of the Kolpa River in the Municipality of Kostel in southern Slovenia. Kostel Castle dominates the cliff to the north above the settlement. The area is part of the traditional region of Lower Carniola and is now included in the Southeast Slovenia Statistical Region.

References

External links
Mavrc on Geopedia

Populated places in the Municipality of Kostel